Football at the 1935 Maccabiah Games was the football tournament held as part of the 1935 Maccabiah Games. It was held in several stadiums in Mandatory Palestine and began on 2 April 1935.

The competition was open for men's teams only. Teams from 6 countries participated, with each team meeting its opponents once. Although not all scores are known, it is known that Romania won the gold medal, Germany won the silver medal and Eretz Yisrael won bronze, followed by Poland, United Kingdom and Lithuania.

Known results
Eretz Yisrael 2–0 Poland (Maccabiah Stadium, Tel Aviv)

Germany 2–1 United Kingdom

Eretz Yisrael 6–1 United Kingdom (Maccabi Ground, Jerusalem)

Poland 3–0 Lithuania

Germany 4–1 Romania

Lithuania 1–0 United Kingdom

Eretz Yisrael 1–3 Germany (Maccabi Ground, Petah Tikva)

Eretz Yisrael 1–0 Lithuania

Poland beat Germany

Romania beat Lithuania

Romania beat United Kingdom

Poland lost to United Kingdom

Romania beat Poland

Germany 2–1 Lithuania (Maccabi Ground, Jerusalem)

Eretz Yisrael 0–1 Romania (Maccabiah Stadium)

Per RSSSF

References
Football at the Maccabiah Games – from 1932 to 1957 Ben Zion Pat, 14 August 1957, Hadshot HaSport, p. 2 

1935
Maccabiah Games